Kysak is a village and railway hub in Košice-okolie District in the Košice Region of eastern Slovakia.

History
Historically, the village was first mentioned in 1330. There is a monument as a memory of the soldiers killed in the first and second World Wars.

Geography
The village lies at an altitude of 298 metres and covers an area of 10.865 km².

Population
The municipality has a population of about 1390 people.

Transport
Kysak railway station is an important railway junction, where the Košice–Plaveč–Čirč–Muszyna railway diverges towards Poland from the Košice–Žilina railway, which is part of Slovakia's main east-west rail corridor.

References

External links
Municipal website 

Villages and municipalities in Košice-okolie District
Šariš